Textilia is a subgenus of sea snails, marine gastropod mollusks in the genus Conus,  family Conidae, the cone snails and their allies.

Species
Species within the genus Textilia include:
 Textilia adamsonii (Broderip, 1836): synonym of  Conus adamsonii Broderip, 1836 (alternate representation)
 Textilia bullata (Linnaeus, 1758): synonym of  Conus bullatus Linnaeus, 1758 (alternate representation)
 Textilia cervus (Lamarck, 1822): synonym of  Conus cervus Lamarck, 1822 (alternate representation)
 Textilia chiapponorum (Lorenz, 2004): synonym of  Conus chiapponorum Lorenz, 2004 (alternate representation)
 Textilia dusaveli (H. Adams, 1872): synonym of  Conus dusaveli (H. Adams, 1872) (alternate representation)
 Textilia floccata (G.B. Sowerby I, 1841): synonym of  Conus floccatus G.B. Sowerby I, 1841 (alternate representation)
 Textilia julii (Lienard, 1870): synonym of  Conus julii Lienard, 1870 (alternate representation)
 Textilia lucasi Bozzetti, 2010: synonym of Conus lucasi (Bozzetti, 2010)
 Textilia proxima (G.B. Sowerby II, 1860): synonym of  Conus proximus G.B. Sowerby II, 1860 (alternate representation)
 Textilia solangeae (Bozzetti, 2004): synonym of  Conus solangeae Bozzetti, 2004 (alternate representation)
 Textilia stercusmuscarum (Linnaeus, 1758): synonym of  Conus stercusmuscarum Linnaeus, 1758 (alternate representation)
 Textilia timorensis (Hwass in Bruguière, 1792): synonym of  Conus timorensis Hwass in Bruguière, 1792 (alternate representation)
 Textilia vicweei (Old, 1973): synonym of  Conus vicweei Old, 1973 (alternate representation)

The following species were brought into synonymy
 Textilia benten Shikama, 1977: synonym of  Conus dusaveli (H. Adams, 1872)
 Textilia pongo Shikama, 1977: synonym of  Conus bullatus Linnaeus, 1758

References

External links
 To World Register of Marine Species

Conidae
Gastropod subgenera